The Regional Theatre Tony Award is a special recognition Tony Award given annually to a regional theater company in the United States.  The winner is recommended by a committee of drama critics.

Background
Initially presented in 1948 to Robert Porterfield of the Virginia Barter Theatre for their Contribution To Development Of Regional Theatre, the Regional Theatre awards were next presented starting in 1976. The award is "based on a recommendation by the American Theatre Critics Association", and includes a grant of $25,000. As the American Theatre Critics Association has noted, no theater has won the award more than once, "testifying to the growing strength of professional theater nationwide." One of the objects of the award is promoting what often amounts to the incubators of new productions.

In June 2013, the Tony Awards Administration Committee stated that effective with the 2013-14 season, "New York-based theatre companies will be eligible to receive the Regional Theatre Award." The Broadway League and American Theatre Wing, in a joint statement, explained: "New York has some of the most prestigious and creative theatre groups in the country and we are thrilled to include the New York theatre community in this category."

Award winners

1940s

1970s

1980s

1990s

2000s

2010s

2020s

See also
 Special Tony Award
 Regional theater in the United States

References

External links

 Official Site Tony Awards

Tony Awards
American theater awards
Awards established in 1948
1948 establishments in the United States